Ralph Herman Coles (June 26, 1913 - July 8, 1984) was an American professional baseball left fielder in the Negro leagues. He played with the Cleveland Bears/Jacksonville Red Caps from 1939 to 1941.

References

External links
 and Seamheads

Cleveland Bears players
Jacksonville Red Caps players
1913 births
1984 deaths
Baseball outfielders
Baseball players from Florida
20th-century African-American sportspeople